O gaúcho is a novel written by the Brazilian writer José de Alencar. It was first published in 1870.

References

External links
 O gaúcho, the book

1870 Brazilian novels
Novels by José de Alencar
Portuguese-language novels
Fictional gauchos
Novels set in Brazil